Laomenes amboinensis is a species of shrimp found in waters off Indonesia, Queensland, New Caledonia, the Marshall Islands, the Ryukyu Islands and Papua New Guinea. It was first named by Johannes Govertus de Man in 1888, as Anchistia amboinensis.

References

External links
 

Palaemonoidea
Crustaceans described in 1888
Taxa named by Johannes Govertus de Man